Luther Ash James-Wildin (born 3 December 1997) is a professional footballer who plays as a right-back for  club Stevenage. Born in England, he represents the Antigua and Barbuda national team. 

James-Wildin joined Notts County's academy in 2014 having previously played for Highfield Rangers in Leicester. He signed his first professional contract with Notts County in May 2016, and spent the 2016–17 season on loan at non-League Northern Premier League club Grantham Town. He was released by Notts County at the end of the campaign and subsequently joined Nuneaton Town of the National League North in July 2017, where he spent one season. James-Wildin joined Stevenage for an undisclosed fee in May 2018.

Early life
Born in Leicester, England, James-Wildin is of Antiguan heritage. He started playing football competitively at the age of seven with Sunday league youth team Highfield Rangers. Wildin stated he was part of a "very successful young side" at Highfield Rangers that remained together for nearly ten years. At the age of 14, he wanted to play at a higher standard after realising he was performing to a high level when playing for Highfield Rangers. Prior to playing professional football, he was in an orchestra and also performed in a jazz band; playing the trumpet to a grade-8 level.

Club career

Notts County
James-Wildin was offered trials at Nottingham Forest and Aston Villa, which were ultimately unsuccessful. He was scouted by Notts County whilst playing in an under-16 match in 2014. He was offered a one-week trial, which proved successful, and he signed a two-year scholarship to join the club's academy. Despite having not made a first-team appearance, James-Wildin signed his first professional contract at Notts County in May 2016.

A month into the 2016–17 season, on 19 September 2016, James-Wildin joined Grantham Town of the Northern Premier League on an initial one-month loan deal, in order to gain first-team experience. The loan agreement was later extended until the end of the season. James-Wildin made his debut for Grantham in a 4–0 victory over Stratford Town in the FA Trophy on 1 November 2016, coming on as a 77th-minute substitute in the match. He established himself as a first-team regular thereafter, scoring his first goal for the club when he gave Grantham the lead in an eventual 2–1 away victory over Coalville Town on 11 April 2017. James-Wildin made 42 appearances in all competitions during the loan spell, scoring twice.

Nuneaton Town
Whilst still on loan at Grantham Town, James-Wildin was told that his one-year contract at Notts County would not be renewed and he subsequently left the club at the end of the 2016–17 campaign. He signed for National League North club Nuneaton Town on 14 July 2017, joining the club alongside his brother, Courtney Wildin. He made his debut for Nuneaton in the club's 1–0 win over Kidderminster Harriers on 8 August 2017. Whilst contracted to Nuneaton, James-Wildin became the first player signed up to Jamie Vardy's V9 Academy on 14 February 2018, a week-long academy that takes place at the end of the season to help non-League footballers into the Football League. He scored his first goal for Nuneaton on 27 February 2018, his second-half strike proving decisive in a 2–1 away win against AFC Telford United. James-Wildin made 38 appearances during the season, scoring twice.

Stevenage
James-Wildin signed for League Two club Stevenage for an undisclosed fee on 16 May 2018. The move reunited Wildin with Stevenage manager Dino Maamria, who had previously managed him at Nuneaton. He made his Stevenage debut in the club's opening match of the 2018–19 season, a 2–2 draw with Tranmere Rovers at Broadhall Way. James-Wildin scored his first Stevenage goal in the club's 2–1 away defeat at Newport County on 13 October 2018. He was the club's first choice right-back throughout the season, making 41 appearances in all competitions as Stevenage finished in tenth position in League Two, one point off of the play-off places.

Remaining at Stevenage for the 2019–20 season, James-Wildin scored with a shot from 30 yards (27 m) in Stevenage's 2–2 draw against Macclesfield Town on 31 August 2019. The goal won the EFL League Two Goal of the Month award. He made 29 appearances during the season, which was curtailed due to the COVID-19 pandemic in March 2020. He played 43 times during the 2020–21 season, scoring two goals, with Stevenage finishing the season in 14th place in League Two. James-Wildin signed a contract extension with Stevenage on 26 June 2021 and made 49 appearances during the 2021–22 season.

International career
James-Wildin qualified to play for Antigua and Barbuda through his ancestry. He was offered the chance to play for Antigua and Barbuda when the national football association of Antigua and Barbuda (ABFA) asked his brother, Courtney, if he had any brothers who were eligible to represent the country. A month later, James-Wildin was subsequently called up to represent the Antigua and Barbuda under-20 team at the 2016 CFU under-20 Tournament. He scored one goal and provided two assists in his three appearances.

In March 2018, he was called up to the Antigua and Barbuda senior team for a pair of friendlies against Bermuda and Jamaica respectively. He made his debut in a 3–2 home win over Bermuda on 21 March 2018, coming on as a 72nd-minute substitute in the match.

Style of play
James-Wildin has predominantly been deployed as a right-back and right wing-back throughout his career. Initially utilised as a central midfielder at the start of his career at Grantham Town, he made the transition to right-back at the start of his time at Nuneaton Town. He has been described as a possessing "athleticism, pace, power and technique" and has also been praised for his temperament in matches. Wildin states he considers his defensive strengths to be one-versus-one defending and stopping crosses early; and his attacking strengths to be providing overlapping runs.

Career statistics

Club

International

References

External links

1997 births
Living people
Footballers from Leicester
Antigua and Barbuda footballers
Antigua and Barbuda international footballers
English footballers
English sportspeople of Antigua and Barbuda descent
Notts County F.C. players
Grantham Town F.C. players
Nuneaton Borough F.C. players
Stevenage F.C. players
National League (English football) players
Association football fullbacks
V9 Academy players
Antigua and Barbuda under-20 international footballers